Nephrogramma separata is a moth in the family Crambidae. It is found in North America, where it has been recorded from Arizona, New Mexico and Texas.

The length of the forewings is 8–10 mm. Adults are on wing from July to September.

References

Moths described in 1972
Glaphyriinae